India Ashlei Trotter (born March 10, 1985) is an American former professional soccer player. She played for Saint Louis Athletica, Sky Blue FC, and the Atlanta Beat of Women's Professional Soccer (WPS) and the United States women's national soccer team.

Early life
Born in Plantation, Florida, Trotter was raised in Fort Lauderdale, where she attended St. Thomas Aquinas High School and was a standout soccer player. She was a three-year starter at St. Thomas Aquinas who scored 62 goals and recorded 47 assists. She earned All-Broward/Dade Team for three years. She was also named Freshman of the Year.

Trotter played club soccer for four years for three-time State Cup Champions, Team Boca. She was named the Nation's Cup Tournament MVP and was State Cup runners-up in 1997 with Coral Springs. Trotter was an Atlanta Cup winner in 2000, Orange Bowl finalist in 2002 and won the Florida State Cup in 1998 with the Coral Springs U-15 team.

Florida State University
Trotter graduated from Florida State University and helped put the Florida State Seminoles women's soccer program on the map. Trotter played at Florida State from 2003–06. During her freshman season,  she helped lead Florida State (17-8-1) to the NCAA Division I Final Four (College Cup) in December 2003. During the tournament, she ranked second on the squad in goals scored and fourth in points and assists.

Playing career

Club

Pali Blues
After graduation, Trotter signed with the Pali Blues of the W-League on June 17, 2008. She left one month later in July 2008 after signing a two-year contract with 1.FFC Frankfurt.

FFC Frankfurt
After playing ten games and scoring one goal for FFC Frankfurt, Trotter announced her retirement from professional football on January 13, 2009. "I decided to pursue other passions that I have in life," Trotter said. "Soccer has done enormous things for me and allowed me to meet contacts and other lifelong friends." Her new priority, however, would be to complete her degree in media productions at Florida State and venture into the business world.

Saint Louis Athletica
Trotter was selected in the second round (14th overall pick) of the 2008 WPS General Draft by Saint Louis Athletica. She was the first player selected by St. Louis in the draft. On March 16, 2010, she was named to Saint Louis' 23 player roster. She made her first appearance for the club on April 25 against the Boston Breakers. She made three appearances for the Athletica playing a total of 34 minutes.

Sky Blue FC
On May 6, 2010 Trotter was traded to Sky Blue FC in return for Anita Asante. She started seven of the ten games that she played for Sky Blue for a total of 612 minutes.

Atlanta Beat
Trotter signed with the Atlanta Beat for the 2011 WPS season. She made six starts in twelve appearances, playing a total of 675 minutes for the squad.

Dalsjöfors GoIF
In 2011, Trotter signed with Swedish Damallsvenskan club, Dalsjöfors GoIF. She made nine starts in nine games played and scored one goal.

International
In 2006, Trotter made two appearances for the United States women's national soccer team. Her first was during the team's 3–1 win over Norway at the Four Nation's Tournament in China.

Coaching career
Trotter served as assistant coach for the University of South Carolina Upstate women's soccer team during the 2012-13 season.

References

External links
US Soccer player profile 
Seminoles player profile 
WPS player profile
University of South Carolina Upstate assistant coach profile 

1985 births
Living people
Sportspeople from Coral Springs, Florida
Florida State Seminoles women's soccer players
United States women's international soccer players
1. FFC Frankfurt players
Frauen-Bundesliga players
Saint Louis Athletica players
NJ/NY Gotham FC players
Atlanta Beat (WPS) players
American expatriate soccer players in Germany
Expatriate women's footballers in Sweden
Pali Blues players
USL W-League (1995–2015) players
People from Plantation, Florida
Dalsjöfors GoIF players
Damallsvenskan players
American women's soccer players
Women's association football defenders
Women's association football midfielders
Women's association football forwards
American expatriate sportspeople in Sweden
American expatriate women's soccer players
Women's Professional Soccer players
Sportspeople from Fort Lauderdale, Florida
College women's soccer coaches in the United States
Syracuse Orange women's soccer coaches
Trotter, India